Tadeja Brankovič (born 20 December 1979) is a retired Slovenian biathlete. She has been a member of the Slovenian biathlon team since 1995. So far she has five podium finishes (two silver and three bronze medals) in the Biathlon World Cup.

Career 

The former instructor in the Slovenian military, Tadeja Brankovič starts for TSK Merkur Kranj. Since 1995 she runs the Biathlon sport and has since also the national team. She now lives in Cerklje na Gorenjskem. Her debut in the Biathlon World Cup Brankovič was 1995 in a single (50) in Östersund. In her first season, they rarely achieved good results and came only three times in the points. Already in its second season, she came in Ostersund in sixth with a single first among the ten best. Her best finish was a second place in a World Cup sprint – again in Ostersund.

Since the 1998 Olympics in Nagano, she participated in all four Olympic games. They always started there in individual, sprint and in the season, 2006 in Turin in the pursuit. In the individual races they never came in the top 30 in the relay race, they achieved the best results 2002 in Salt Lake City in 2006 and ranks sixth. Looks like its balance sheet at the World Championships in which she participated since 1996 in at least one sub-discipline. Best finish was a 26th in singles at the World Championships in 2001 in Pokljuka.

Between 2004 and 2007, Tadeja was achieved the fantastic results, but in 2007 she was going to hiatus for two seasons, due to pregnancy when was gave birth to her daughter Maša, in 2009, after she married with a former handball player Domen Likozar. She was returned for the 2009–10 season, but has not made approximately good results before going to the hiatus. After a 2010–11 season, Brankovič was gave birth to her son and then was retired.

References

External links
Official site of the former biathlete and author of the book The Fifth Olympics
IBU Profile

1979 births
Living people
Sportspeople from Kranj
Slovenian female biathletes
Olympic biathletes of Slovenia
Biathletes at the 1998 Winter Olympics
Biathletes at the 2002 Winter Olympics
Biathletes at the 2006 Winter Olympics
Biathletes at the 2010 Winter Olympics